Meʼen (also Mekan, Mieʼen, Mieken, Meqan, Men) is a Nilo-Saharan language (Eastern Sudanic, Surmic, Southeast Surmic) spoken in Ethiopia by the Meʼen people. In recent years, it has been written with the Geʽez alphabet, but in 2007 a decision was made to use the Latin alphabet. Dialects include Bodi (Podi) and Tishena (Teshina, Teshenna).

Meʼen and Kwegu are unique among Surmic languages in that they have ejective consonants.

Reliable descriptions of some parts of the language have been produced by Hans-Georg Will, often contradicting Carlo Conti Rossini's work, the editing of the extensive language notes of a non-linguist.

Phonology
Consonants are,

Notes

References
Conti Rossini, Carlo. (1913). "I Mekan o Suro nell'Etiopia meridionale e il loro linguaggio." Rendiconti della Reale Accademia dei Lincei XXII (7-10): 397-463.
Diehl, Achim and Hans-Georg Will. (2007). "Meˀen language." In Siegbert Uhlig (ed.), Encyclopaedia Aethiopica 3, 907-909. Wiesbaden: Harrassowitz Verlag.
Eba Teresa Garoma and Amanuel Raga Yadate. 2015. Sketch [of] Morphology and Syntax of Meʼenit. International Journal Advances in Social Science and Humanities Vol.3, Issue 7, pp. 30–50.
Will, Hans-Georg. 1989. "Sketch of Meʼen grammar." In M. Lionel Bender (ed.), Topics in Nilo-Saharan linguistics 129-50. Nilo-Saharan, 3. Hamburg: Helmut Buske.
Will, Hans-Georg. 1998. "The Meʼen verb system: Does Meʼen have tenses?." In Gerrit J. Dimmendaal and Marco Last (eds.), Surmic languages and cultures, 437-58. Nilo-Saharan, 13. Cologne: R. Köppe

External links
 Meʼen basic lexicon at the Global Lexicostatistical Database
 World Atlas of Language Structures information on Meʼen

Languages of Ethiopia
Surmic languages